Kemosabe Records is an American record label founded by American record producer and songwriter Dr. Luke and owned by Sony Music Entertainment. The label is based in Los Angeles, California.

History
In November 2011, Sony Music Entertainment announced a partnership with American record producer and songwriter Lukasz "Dr. Luke" Gottwald to launch his record label Kemosabe Records. The label jointly signs their artists with various labels under Sony, most predominantly RCA Records for their U.S. based artists. Gottwald was given the rights to hire his own staff, sign artists and develop talent, but he was only able to produce records for Sony artists until 2016. In April 2017, Sony distanced itself from the producer after singer Kesha accused him of rape. As of April 26, 2017, the Kemosabe website is no longer accessible. On the RCA and Sony Music's Website, Kemosabe has also been removed from the "Labels" list, and the "Facts and Figures" page on Sony's website.

Notable artists

Current
Becky G 
Doja Cat 
Kesha

Former
Juicy J 
Yelle 
LunchMoney Lewis 
G.R.L. 
Bonnie McKee 
Lil Bibby 
Elliphant 
R. City 
Paper Route

Discography
Kesha – Cannibal (November 19, 2010)
Kesha – Warrior (December 4, 2012)
Kesha – Deconstructed (February 5, 2013)
Becky G – Play It Again (July 16, 2013)
Various Artists – Music from and Inspired by The Smurfs 2 (July 23, 2013)
Juicy J – Stay Trippy (August 27, 2013)
Elliphant – Look Like You Love It (April 1, 2014)
G.R.L. – G.R.L. (July 29, 2014)
Christian Burghardt – Safe Place To Land (September 9, 2014)
Yelle – Complètement fou (September 29, 2014)
Doja Cat – Purrr! (August 5, 2014)
Elliphant – One More (October 13, 2014)
LunchMoney Lewis – Bills (April 21, 2015)
Yelle – Complètement fou (Remix) (July 24, 2015)
R. City – What Dreams Are Made Of (October 9, 2015)
Elliphant – Living Life Golden (March 25, 2016)
Paper Route – Real Emotion (September 23, 2016)
Lil Bibby – FC3: The Epilogue (March 8, 2017)
Kesha – Rainbow (August 11, 2017)
Juicy J – Rubba Band Business (December 8, 2017)
Doja Cat – Amala (March 30, 2018)
Becky G - Mala Santa (October 17, 2019)
Doja Cat – Hot Pink (November 7, 2019)
Kesha – High Road (January 31, 2020)
Doja Cat – Planet Her (June 25, 2021)
Becky G – Esquemas (May 13, 2022)

Notes

References

American record labels
Music publishing companies of the United States
Record labels established in 2011
Sony Music
Companies based in Los Angeles